Hamed Sinno (born 25 April 1988) is the Lebanese-American lead singer of the alternative rock band Mashrou' Leila.

Early life 
Sinno was born to a Lebanese father who had lived in the United States and a Jordanian mother who had lived between Morocco and Rome. He has American citizenship.

Sinno grew up in an Anglophone household. He attended an American school and graduated "not knowing how to properly speak Arabic", mostly learning Arabic as he wrote songs. Sinno did not learn to read music nor did he have formal musical training. However, he sang in the school choir.

While studying at the American University of Beirut, Sinno came out. There he also began to experiment with subversive graffiti as a form of self-expression before getting involved with Mashrou' Leila.

Career 
Sinno co-founded Mashrou' Leila in 2008 while studying graphic design at the American University of Beirut, when responding to an open jam session call put out by Andre Chedid, Omaya Malaeb, and Haig Papazian.

According to Sinno, his parents initially disapproved of his career in music, fearing for his financial prospects and physical safety due to the band's controversial reputation.

In media 
Sinno has been featured on the cover of several magazines, including France's Têtu, Jordan's My.Kali, and UK-based Attitude. He also appeared on the cover of the Middle East edition of Rolling Stone magazine as part of Mashrou' Leila.

Sinno figured in a painting by the Iranian artist Alireza Shojaian dubbed Hamed Sinno et un de ses fréres. In the painting Sinno is depicted pinching the nipple of Anubis, the ancient Egyptian god of funerary rites. Anubis sports a rainbow colored Usekh collar alluding to the pride flag. The work references and draws inspiration from a painting by an unknown painter, titled Gabrielle d’Estrées et une de ses soeurs, that depicts the mistress of Henry IV of France. The collaboration with Sinno was a statement against systematic state-led persecution of LGBT minorities in Egypt. Shojaian painted the piece after the September 22, 2017 Mashrou' Leila concert in Cairo, during which the pride flag was flown. The Cairo pride flag incident resulted in the arrest of a number of concert-goers.

Personal life 
Sinno is gay and advocates for LGBT rights in the Middle East and around the world. He lectured and graduated at Dartmouth College in New Hampshire.

References

External links
 

1988 births
American rock singers
American University of Beirut alumni
Dartmouth College alumni
American gay musicians
Lebanese people of Jordanian descent
Lebanese rock musicians
Lebanese LGBT people
American LGBT singers
American LGBT songwriters
Living people
21st-century LGBT people
20th-century LGBT people
Gay songwriters
Gay singers